Frank N. Seerley (November 21, 1859 – 1946) was an American football coach. He served as the head football coach at his alma mater, the Springfield YMCA Training School—now known as Springfield College—in Springfield, Massachusetts from 1892 to 1894, compiling a record of 7–3–2. He was the brother of Homer Horatio Seerley, president of the Iowa State Normal School / Iowa State Teachers College Teachers College—now known as University of Northern Iowa—from 1886 to 1928.

References

External links
 

1859 births
1946 deaths
Springfield Pride football coaches
Springfield College (Massachusetts) alumni
University of Northern Iowa alumni
People from Keokuk County, Iowa